Targa High Country is a tarmac-based rally event held on the state of Victoria, Australia, annually. The inaugural event was 2010. The event has a short course design of approximately 200 competitive kilometres covered in two days over sixteen closed road competitive rally stages.

Rally format 

The event is held north of Melbourne in the high country area and race around Mansfield on the first day of competition.

 Leg 0 Mansfield Prologue - Mansfield
 Leg 1 King Valley to Mt Buller - King Valley - Mt Buller
 Leg 2 Eildon to Mt Buller - Eildon - Mt Buller

List of past winners

Modern Competition

Classic Competition

Other Targa competitions
 Targa Tasmania - Australia (TAS)
 Targa New Zealand - New Zealand
 Targa Florio - Italy
 Targa West - Australia (WA)
 Targa Newfoundland - Canada
 Targa Canada West - Canada

See also
Australian Targa Championship

References

www.targatasmania.com.au/Results/Past 
http://www.targatasmania.com.au/ 
2010 Targa High Country Results

External links
 Targa High Country website

Motorsport competitions in Australia
Rally competitions in Australia
Motorsport in Victoria (Australia)